William Heaton Cooper RA (6 October 1903 – 1995) was a notable English impressionistic landscape artist who worked predominantly in watercolours, most famous for his paintings of the Lake District. Since the 1950s, he has become known as one of the most celebrated British landscape artists of the 20th century.

Life
Heaton Cooper was born in Coniston, Cumbria, in the English Lake District in 1903, the third child to a Norwegian mother, Mathilde, and the landscape artist Alfred Heaton Cooper.

William Heaton Cooper was strongly influenced by his father's artistic style. Alfred lived entirely by his painting and William soon aspired to follow in his father's footsteps. He gained a scholarship to the Royal Academy School in London and subsequently exhibited at the Royal Academy, with the Royal Society of British Artists and the Royal Institute. Alongside his painting, he became an authority on the lore and landscape of the Lake District, walking and rock climbing in its mountains with the pioneer climbers of the 1920s. He was noted for his knowledge of the Lakeland fells, their structure and their geography. This knowledge is apparent from his illustration of the rock climbing guides published by the Fell & Rock Climbing Club, of which he was elected life president.

In 1953, he was elected to membership of the Royal Institute of British Watercolourists and was for eleven years president of the Lake Artists Society. At the time of his father's death in 1929, William was living in the south of England in an experimental commune, which was home to a variety of people with artistic talents and was a source of inspiration for him. Heaton Cooper left the south to take over the studio in Ambleside which his father had built, in order to provide for his mother and younger sister. A period of intense unhappiness followed during which a search for inner peace and integrity led him on a religious quest, culminating in his adoption of the doctrines of the Oxford Movement. The strength of his sincere belief in the tenets of this movement led him to ignore the more contentious side of its dogma. He decided that he would hand over control of his whole life to God. He claimed that this included a commitment even to give up painting if God so wished. He remained convinced that this decision enabled him to find it in himself to love, and always referred to the moment as his 'release'.

His painting continued to improve, so much so that he soon eclipsed the reputation of his father. A decision was taken to move the studio business to Grasmere, and the building of a home and studio there began in 1938. In the same year he met the sculptress, Ophelia Gordon Bell, who in 1940 became his wife.

It was after the Second World War, in which Heaton Cooper served as a camouflage officer, that the idea of reproduction sales occurred. For many years William, like Alfred before him, had needed to produce a constant output of original paintings to earn a living. The advent of improved colour printing techniques meant that more faithful reproductions of originals could be made, which enabled Heaton Cooper's popularity to spread.

William died in 1995 and is buried in Grasmere. Obituaries in the Times, Guardian and Daily Telegraph paid tribute to his outstanding contribution to landscape art.

Style
William's style of mountain painting is more impressionistic than his father's, with his knowledge of geology used to the full in his sometimes spare and skeletal depiction of crags and fells. He was fascinated by the ever changing light of Lakeland, with views seldom looking twice alike. His most spectacular pictures were obtained in the light of evening or dawn, to which end he would walk miles over the fells, camping out to capture the late or early glows over fell tops and lakes. The result has been a body of work which continues to give pleasure to thousands of visitors to the English Lakes. Likewise his books on the area continue to delight the Lakeland enthusiast.

His legacy is not simply in his art. Through his painting he manages to suggest the deep spirituality with which he regarded his life and work. The spare and deceptively simple renderings of Lakeland landscapes reflect the simplicity of his belief, whilst revealing the depth of his knowledge.

References

External links
Heaton Cooper Studios

1903 births
1995 deaths
20th-century English painters
English male painters
English watercolourists
Landscape artists
People from Coniston, Cumbria
People from Grasmere (village)
20th-century English male artists